These are the former and current vice-chancellors and principals (positions which have been merged since 1948), and chancellors of the University of the Witwatersrand, Johannesburg.

Vice-chancellors and principals
The vice-chancellor and principal is the head of the university, supported by five deputy vice-chancellors. Prior to 1948, the positions were separate, with the position of vice-chancellor being inconsequential.

Principals: 1922–1948
 Jan Hendrik Hofmeyr: 1922–1924
 Humphrey Raikes: 1928-1948

Vice-chancellors and principals: 1948–present

 Humphrey Raikes: 1948–1953
William G Sutton: 1954–1962
Ian Douglas MacCrone: 1963–1968
Guerino Renzo Bozzoli: 1968–1977
 Daniel Jacob Du Plessis: 1978–1983
 Karl Tober: 1984–1988
 Robert Charlton: 1988–1997
 Colin Bundy: 1997–2001
 Norma Ried-Birley: 2001–2003
 Loyiso Nongxa: 2003–2013
Prof Adam Habib: 2013–2020
Prof Zeblon Vilakazi 2021–present

Chancellors
The chancellor is the titular head of the university who, in the name of the university, confers all degrees.

 Prince Arthur of Connaught: 1922–1938
 Jan Hendrik Hofmeyr: 1939–1948
Richard Feetham: 1949–1961
Oliver Schreiner: 1962–1974
Bertrand Leon Bernstein: 1975–1982
Aanon Michael Rosholt: 1982–1996
 Justice Richard Goldstone: 1996–2006
 Deputy Chief Justice Dikgang Moseneke: 2006–2018
Dr Judy Dlamini: 2018–present

See also
 List of South African university chancellors and vice-chancellors

References

University of the Witwatersrand